Raba Wyżna is a village in Poland, situated in Lesser Poland Voivodeship, Nowy Targ County. It is a seat of Raba Wyżna Commune. As of 2006, the village had 4116 inhabitants. Raba Wyżna is also the birthplace of Stanisław Dziwisz, trusted secretary to Pope John Paul II.

History

1500s-1800s
Settlement began at what is now Raba Wyżna in the 1550s. According to local records, in the year 1581 the village consisted of 43 farms.

The first church in Raba Wyżna was a small, wooden church called the church of St. Stanisław Bishop and Martyr, a Catholic church built in 1581. Though the Raba Wyżna church was initially part of the Rabka parish, by 1618 Raba Wyżna became its own parish. In 1668 a new church was built in the village and was consecrated by Bishop Mikołaj Oborski of Krakow.

In 1846-1847 the village and surrounding areas suffered a typhus outbreak and a great famine due to crop failure. Over 1/3 of the village inhabitants died. According to the 1847 record books, in Raba Wyżna alone 455 people died, and 877 remained alive in the parish. In the nearby village of Spytkowice 511 people died that same year. The number of corpses overwhelmed the church, and a new cemetery was built out of necessity in September of 1847.

First and Second World Wars
The first world war touched the village of Raba Wyzna, and the Austrian army pillaged the town and stole the church bell. 

World War II brought more chaos to the village, causing some local inhabitants to leave their homes. On September 2, 1939 a battle between the Germans and Polish armies swept through the town, resulting in 40 homes being burnt to the ground and many civilians killed. The local church was plundered, books were burned, and the church bells were stolen by the German army. The day after the battle, a group of local men on their way to church were kidnapped by the German army and transported to the Mauthausen concentration camp in Austria. The German army occupied the town from 1939 until 1946. In 1942 the church was temporarily closed due to a dysentery outbreak in the town.

In 1946, the German occupation had ended and the rebuilding of the town began. In 1947 a new church bell were purchased, weighing 300kg. In 1968 two more bells were purchased for the church, affectionately called "Stanislaw" and "Jozef."

External links
Official site of Raba Wyżna
Raba Wyżna parish website
Scanned Raba Wyżna church records, made available by the Polish Genealogical Society
Searchable index of Raba Wyżna church records

References

Villages in Nowy Targ County

it:Raba Wyżna